Siri Seglem (born 30 March 1983) is a Norwegian handball player. She is currently team leader for EH Aalborg in the Damehåndboldligaen.

She made her debut on the Norwegian national team in 2006, and has played 23 matches and scored 31 goals.

References

External links

Norwegian female handball players
1983 births
Living people
People from Sokndal
Norwegian expatriate sportspeople in Denmark
Sportspeople from Rogaland